Aliff Haiqal bin Lokman Hakim Lau (born 11 July 2000) is a Malaysian professional footballer who plays as a midfielder for Malaysia Super League club Selangor and the Malaysia national team.

Club career

PKNS

Born in Kajang, Selangor to a Chinese descent father and Malay mother, Aliff started his career at PKNS youth team and made his first professional debut in a Super League match against Melaka United on 16 July 2019. He only played two matches with the club on that season.

Selangor

With the departure of PKNS FC from a part in professional football and has been changed sides to become 'Reserve Team' (now as Selangor II) for Selangor Football Club, Aliff switch sides to join the club and been choose to stay under with reserve team. He made his debut and scored his first goal for Selangor II on 28 August 2020 against Kuching in a 2020 Malaysia Premier League matches. 

He broke into the senior team for the first time as an unused substitute in a Super League match against UiTM on 26 September 2020. Later, he was promoted to the first team on 2 December 2020 ahead of the 2021 season.

International career

Aliff has played for several Malaysia youth sides. He played for the U-16 team and U-19 team from 2014 to 2019, and gradually made into the older classes. He currently plays for the U-23 team. On 14 December 2022, Aliff made his debut with senior team in a friendly match against Maldives after coming on as a substitute at 70th minute in place of Mukhairi Ajmal.

Career statistics

Club

Honours
Selangor
 Malaysia Cup runner-up: 2022

References

External links
 

Malaysian footballers
People from Selangor
Malaysian sportspeople of Chinese descent
Association football forwards
Association football midfielders
Malaysia Super League players
PKNS F.C. players
Living people
2000 births
Malaysian people of Malay descent